A Siwawa (silk doll) is a Chinese dish, native to and a local specialty of the Guizhou province, consisting of a paper thin glutinous rice pancake that is small enough to fit easily in one's palm, and is wrapped around fillings of julienned fresh, fermented, or stir-fried vegetables such as shredded cucumber, pickled turnip, fried soybeans, crushed chilis, shredded kelp, shredded potato, pickled radish, mung bean sprouts, zhe ergen, pickled jucai, and jueba bracken fern roots. Some vendors include fried pork as a filling. The dish traditionally is a common street food or hawker food but eventually started to appear at events such as weddings. It is one of the most well-known of Guizhou's traditional snack foods but is also eaten as a formal meal. 

Spicy and sour flavoured sauces known as zhanshui are typically added to the wrap or used as a dipping sauce. One combination of ingredients for a sauce is stock, dried chili flakes and sesame oil.

The name of the dish means 'baby in swaddling clothes', referring to the dish's appearance being similar to an infant wrapped in silk. It also resembles an uncooked egg roll and is "a member of the spring roll family".

See also
 Guizhou cuisine

References 

Guizhou
Chinese cuisine
Vegan cuisine